Bębina  is a settlement in the administrative district of Gmina Jutrosin, within Rawicz County, Greater Poland Voivodeship, in west-central Poland.

The main language spoken in this settlement is Polish; however, a dialect of Russian is also spoken.

References

Villages in Rawicz County